The 2014–15 New Orleans Privateers men's basketball team represented the University of New Orleans during the 2014–15 NCAA Division I men's basketball season. The Privateers were led by fourth year head coach Mark Slessinger and played their home games at Lakefront Arena. They were new members of the Southland Conference.

The Privateers were picked to finish ninth (9th) in both the Southland Conference Coaches' Poll and the Sports Information Directors Poll.  The team finished the season with an 11–18 overall record including a record of 1–1 in the 2015 Southland Conference Men's Basketball Tournament.  The Privateers finished conference play tied for tenth place with a final record of 6–12.

Roster

Schedule
Source

|-
!colspan=9 style="background:#003399; color:#C0C0C0;"| Out of Conference

|-
!colspan=9 style="background:#003399; color:#C0C0C0;"| Conference Games

|-
!colspan=9 style="background:#003399; color:#C0C0C0;"| Southland tournament

See also
2014–15 New Orleans Privateers women's basketball team

References

New Orleans Privateers men's basketball seasons
New Orleans
2014 in sports in Louisiana
2015 in sports in Louisiana